Claudia Grace Wells (born July 5, 1966) is an American actress and businesswoman, best known for her role as Jennifer Parker in the 1985 film Back to the Future.

Life and career
Wells was born in Kuala Lumpur, Malaysia, but her family moved to San Francisco when she was seven weeks old. She went to Marin Country Day School and French-American Bilingual School. Her father, a parasitologist, and sister, Jennifer, still live in San Francisco, but Wells moved to Los Angeles at the age of 14, later graduating from Beverly Hills High School. Wells also has a brother.

She started acting with appearances in TV shows. When she was 15, she became a born-again Christian at the urging of Dean Jones on the set of Herbie, the Love Bug.

Wells played Jennifer Parker, Marty McFly's girlfriend, in the 1985 film Back to the Future. She almost did not end up in the first film of the successful franchise. According to Wells, she had been cast, but a pilot she had done for ABC had been picked up, and she was contractually forced to drop out of Back to the Future. During that time, Eric Stoltz had been shooting for five weeks in the role of Marty McFly. Melora Hardin was slated for the role of Jennifer though she never actually filmed any scenes. The producers halted filming and replaced Stoltz with Michael J. Fox. By then, Wells's pilot had been finished and she was recast as Jennifer, now shooting alongside Fox, having never filmed a frame with Stoltz.

That same year (1985), Wells co-starred in Stop the Madness, an anti-drug music video sponsored by the Reagan administration, featuring several famous musicians, actors and athletes. The following year, she appeared in the TV movie Babies Having Babies, and the short-lived series Fast Times, a TV adaptation of the 1982 film Fast Times at Ridgemont High (Wells played Linda Barrett, portrayed by Phoebe Cates in the film). Following Fast Times, she did not appear again on-screen until the 1996 independent film, Still Waters Burn (released on DVD February 12, 2008).

Leaving acting
After her mother was diagnosed with cancer, Wells put her career on hold for family reasons, and told the studio she would be unavailable to reprise her Back to the Future role for the two sequels. Actress Elisabeth Shue replaced her.

In the early 1990s, Wells started a clothing store, Armani Wells, which she still manages as of 2023.<https://www.armaniwells.com/>

Return to acting
After a lengthy absence, Wells returned to acting in 2011 with a small role in the independent science-fiction film, Alien Armageddon.

The same year, Wells had the opportunity to reprise her role from Back to the Future 26 years after her last appearance in the series. She provided the voice of Jennifer Parker for Back to the Future: The Game. Wells announced that her next project would be a horror film titled Room & Board.

Filmography

Film

Television

Video games

References

External links
 
 
 Armani Wells, a clothing store founded and run by Wells.
 Back to the Future website

20th-century American actresses
21st-century American actresses
Actresses from San Francisco
American businesspeople in retailing
American film actresses
American television actresses
Living people
American Christians
1966 births